Jarm Afshar (also Romanized as Jarm Afshār; also known as Garmafshār) is a village in Dasht Rural District, in the Central District of Shahreza County, Isfahan Province, Iran. At the 2006 census, its population was 1,687, in 437 families.

References 

Populated places in Shahreza County